Iveta Benešová was the defending champion, but did not compete this year.

Flavia Pennetta won the title by defeating Ľudmila Cervanová 3–6, 7–5, 6–3 in the final.

Seeds

Draw

Finals

Top half

Bottom half

Qualifying

Seeds

Qualifiers

Qualifying draw

First qualifier

Second qualifier

Third qualifier

Fourth qualifier

References

External links
 Official results archive (ITF)
 Official results archive (WTA)

2005 Abierto Mexicano Telcel
Abierto Mexicano Telcel